Abbasabad Complex is related to the Timurid and the Qajar. This complex is located 34 kilometers north of Taybad.

Gallery

References 

Buildings and structures in Razavi Khorasan Province
National works of Iran
Tourist attractions in Razavi Khorasan Province